Felis margarita margarita, sometimes called the Saharan sand cat, is a subspecies of the sand cat native to the Sahara.

Taxonomy 
Victor Loche first described a sand cat zoological specimen found in the northern Algerian Sahara. He named it Felis margarita in recognition of Jean Auguste Margueritte, who headed the expedition into the Sahara. This is the nominate subspecies.

Following Loche's description, Reginald Innes Pocock described two more sand cat specimens from North Africa in 1938:
Felis margarita meinertzhageni, a specimen from the Algerian Sahara.
Felis margarita aïrensis, a specimen from the Aïr Mountains area in southwestern French Sudan.

Today, these taxa are not recognized as valid but considered synonyms of F. m. margarita, the nominate subspecies.

Characteristics
The Saharan sand cat is the smallest of all the four subspecies. It has a bright fur colour, pronounced markings and 2–6 rings on the tail.

Distribution and habitat
The Saharan sand cat is patchily distributed in desert areas of Morocco, Algeria, Niger and Egypt.

Ecology and behaviour
Sand cats prey on small rodents, birds and reptiles. They drink water if available, but satisfy most of their moisture need from prey, which they can dig out of the sand quickly. They have also been observed to hunt and consume horned and sand vipers.

Reproduction
In the Sahara, sand cats mate in the cold season between November and February. Young are born between January and April.

A noise similar to a bark of a dog is thought to be a mating call. Captive sand cats normally have three kittens in a litter and have more than one litter per year.

Threats
The sand cat is threatened by expanding human settlements, and is killed in traps set up by herders. Domestic dogs and cats are direct competitors for prey, and possibly transmit diseases.

References

Further reading
Sausman, K. 1997. Sand cat: a true desert species. International Zoo Yearbook 35(1): 78–81.
"Social Interactions and Solitary Behaviors in a Pair of Captive Sand Cats (Felis Margarita)." - Bennett. N.p., n.d. Web. 12 Oct. 2012.

External links
Arkive.org: "Sand Cat (Felis Margarita)."

margarita
Fauna of the Sahara
Mammals described in 1858
Taxa named by Victor Loche